Lodders is a Dutch surname. Notable people with the surname include:

Catharina Lodders (born 1942), Dutch model
Helma Lodders (born 1968), Dutch politician
Katharina Lodders, German-American cosmochemist
Robin Lodders (born 1994), German basketball player

See also
Lodder

Dutch-language surnames